Khuskia is a fungal genus in the class Sordariomycetes. The relationship of this taxon to other taxa within the class is unknown (incertae sedis). A monotypic genus, it contains the single species Khuskia oryzae, described as new to science in 1963.

References

Monotypic Sordariomycetes genera
Sordariomycetes enigmatic taxa